Saga: Rage of the Vikings is a French real-time strategy video game developed and published by Cryo Interactive in 1998 on Windows. The game is loosely based on the historical Vikings, with elements taken from Norse mythology. The gameplay sees players gather resources, build buildings and units, and defeat the competitors.

Critical reception 
GameBlitz felt the game was competent, yet non-innovative. Game Over Online thought the game was a disappointment due to not being particularly groundbreaking. Generation4 compared the game to the Age of Empires series.

References

External links 

 Absolute Games review
Gry Online review
Chronicart review

1998 video games
Real-time strategy video games
Video games based on Norse mythology
Video games developed in France
Video games set in the Viking Age
Works based on sagas
Windows games
Windows-only games